Marcinkonys Eldership is a Lithuanian eldership, located in the south western part of Varėna District Municipality.

Geography
Marcinkonys Eldership is mostly covered by the Dainava Forest and it is one of the most sparsely populated and largest Lithuanian elderships. It is in the Dainava Plain, undulated with massifs of continental dunes. The Čepkeliai Marsh is located at its southern part. Most of the eldership is inside the Dzūkija National Park.

 Rivers: Merkys, Ūla, Grūda, Skroblus.
 Lakes and ponds: Lavysas, Grūda Lake, Kastinis, Trikampis.
 Marshes: Čepkeliai Marsh
 Forests: Dainava Forest.
 Protected areas: Dzūkija National Park, Čepkeliai Nature Reserve.

Places of interest
Wooden Catholic churches in Marcinkonys and Kabeliai villages
Dzūkian Etnographical Museum in Marcinkonys
Dzūkian Traditional Beekeeping Museum in Musteika
Etnographical villages of Musteika, Margionys, Dubininkas, Zervynos, Mardasavas.
Gražina Didelytė gallery "Andeinė" in Rudnia.
Folk theater in Margionys.
Old beekeeping hollows in pine trees (dravės).
'Lietuvio' lime tree in Margionys.
Skroblus river source "Woman's Garden" (Bobos Daržas) in Margionys.
Ūla river cliffs between Zervynos and Mančiagirė.
The source "Ūla Eye" (Ūlos akis) nearby Mančiagirė.

Populated places 
Following settlements are located in the Marcinkonys Eldership (as for the 2021 census):

References

Elderships in Varėna District Municipality